"Wilson" is the tenth episode of the sixth season of House. It aired on November 30, 2009. In contrast to the usual storylines focused on Gregory House, this episode centered on James Wilson and a day in his life.

Plot 

Gregory House wakes James Wilson from sleep at 6:30 am by playing his guitar and singing "Faith" by George Michael. House is curious as to why Wilson is not getting ready for work, and Wilson explains that he is not going to work – he is taking a day off, and going hunting with a friend. He returns to bed but is followed by House who states that the person Wilson is going hunting with is not a friend but a "self-important jerk" who does not even know his name (calling him Jim). Wilson ignores him and goes back to sleep.

The hunting trip is with a former leukemia patient named Tucker, who credits Wilson with saving his life 5 years prior. He wants to reward "Jim" in various ways (such as taking him on this hunting trip) for saving his life. They follow a ritual of sticking an empty chemotherapy bag onto a tree, Wilson labeling it with the number of years Tucker has been free of cancer and Tucker shooting the bag. Wilson turns away, using a hunting whistle to try to attract turkeys, suddenly Tucker misfires, narrowly missing Wilson's head. Wilson turns around alarmed, finding Tucker on the ground and complaining he cannot move his arm.

Tucker is summarily taken to the hospital for diagnostic tests. Initially, Wilson diagnoses the man with transverse myelitis after noticing that Tucker's girlfriend has a cold sore, the virus of which if transmitted to Tucker could be the cause of his sudden onset paralysis. He prescribes Acyclovir, feeling proud of his "House-like" diagnostic coup. House, however, bets Wilson $100 that it is actually a recurrence of his cancer, which Wilson refuses to believe. Tucker is discovered to have acute lymphoblastic leukemia, a different form of leukemia than the one he was previously treated for (the chemo treatment of which possibly caused/complicated this new recurrence). The cancer seems very treatable, but Tucker does not initially respond to treatment. During the treatment process, regardless of House's warning Wilson decides to employ a double dose of chemotherapy, which does cure the cancer but leads to severe liver damage. Wilson is horrified to realize that without a transplant, Tucker has about twenty-four hours to live.

House informs Wilson of a motorcycle accident victim recently admitted who might be a potential donor, but his sister, an Asian woman who appears to be a member of Mahikari, is unwilling to allow the organ donation because she does not want to violate his remains before burial. After visiting her home and unsuccessfully trying to convince her, Wilson learns that it is too late anyway as the liver has already degraded beyond usefulness.

Remembering Wilson had donated blood to him before, Tucker realizes his friend would be a compatible donor and impinges on their friendship by pleading for Wilson to donate a portion of his own liver to save his life. While Wilson feels that to do so would violate his professional ethics, he considers complying due to a sense of guilt over prescribing the double dose of chemotherapy that destroyed his liver. House finds it asinine how that Wilson is blaming himself for treating his patient's cancer.

After seeing how Tucker had reunited with his estranged family in light of his dire situation and wishing to extend this time for him, Wilson finally relents to his friend's plea and plans to go ahead with the operation to donate a portion of his liver. Before the operation, Wilson asks House to be there for the operation. House, showcasing a rare moment of vulnerability, initially refuses by revealing to Wilson that he cannot since "If you die, I'm alone." At the operation, as Wilson is being anesthetized, he sees House enter the viewing area above and smiles just as the anesthetic fully kicks in. After the operation however, Tucker reverts to his selfish old ways, and tells Wilson: "The person you want when you're dying isn't the same person you want when you're living." Now that he is going to live, Tucker reveals he is summarily casting his family aside again to again pursue a new love interest, one even younger (almost the same age as his own daughter). This makes Wilson lose respect for him.

Meanwhile, the relationship between Lisa Cuddy and Lucas Douglas continues, shown from Wilson's point of view. Cuddy wants to buy a new home through Wilson's realtor ex-wife, Bonnie, and is seeking House's approval, also indirectly through Wilson. Complaining she has hurt him, House schemes and plots to interfere with this latest relationship development, again through Wilson. Later, Wilson takes House to the fancy new loft apartment that Cuddy had wanted, and tells House he has bought it instead (Bonnie disclosed Cuddy's bid so he was able to outbid her, practically "stealing" it from under her). He explains that he did so because she had hurt his friend (House) so "deserved to be punished". The two of them also needed a bigger place to live in, "with space for a larger refrigerator!"

Music 
"Faith" (by George Michael) performed by Hugh Laurie
"A Slow Parade" by A.A. Bondy

Critical response 

Zack Handlen of The A.V. Club rated the episode A−, saying he really enjoyed the episode and was excited not because of big moments or shocking revelation but rather because of how well the friendship of House and Wilson was played.

References

External links 

House (season 6) episodes
2009 American television episodes
Television episodes directed by Lesli Linka Glatter

fr:L'Ami de Wilson
it:Episodi di Dr. House - Medical Division (sesta stagione)#Wilson